Carleton Herbert Wright (June 2, 1892 – June 27, 1973) was a rear admiral in the United States Navy (USN).

Early career
Wright graduated from the United States Naval Academy in 1912 with a class standing of 16th out of 156 graduates.

After World War I, Wright attended the USN's ordnance postgraduate course from 1918 through 1920. He then had various ship and staff assignments afloat and ordnance-related posts ashore until 1935. From 1935 to 1936, he commanded Destroyer Division 18. From 1936 to 1938 he served on the staff of Comsofor, and then at the Naval Mine Depot at Yorktown until 1941.

World War II
At the outbreak of World War II, Wright was the captain of the U.S. cruiser . Wright was promoted to rear admiral in May 1942 and commanded warship forces under William Halsey during the Guadalcanal campaign. As commander of Task Group 67, Wright led his force of five cruisers and four destroyers against a Japanese "Tokyo Express" force of eight destroyers on the night of November 30, 1942. The battle was one of the worst defeats that the U.S. Navy suffered in World War II. Wright was awarded the Navy Cross for his performance in the battle, but was also reassigned to shore duty at the U.S. Navy's staff in Washington, D.C.

Wright later commanded the U.S. Navy's Cruiser Division 4 in the central Pacific in 1944 before returning to shore duty as a member of the staff and later commander of the 12th Naval District in San Francisco. On July 17, 1944, the Port Chicago disaster—two explosions in which 302 men were killed and two ships obliterated, thought to be caused by mishandling of ammunition by untrained shiploaders—occurred under his command. Afterward Wright ordered the General Courts Martial of 50 African-American men found guilty of mutiny after expressing fear and refusing to return to work loading ammunition.

Post war
In March 1946, he became the Inspector General of the Pacific Fleet and Pacific Ocean Area. Wright later served as the deputy commander of the Marianas before retiring from the U.S. Navy in October 1948. He died in Claremont, California, on June 27, 1973.

References

Books

Web

Notes

1892 births
1973 deaths
United States Navy personnel of World War I
United States Naval Academy alumni
United States Navy rear admirals (lower half)
United States Navy World War II admirals
People from New Hampton, Iowa
Military personnel from Iowa
Recipients of the Navy Cross (United States)